I Am KC is the first Philippine drama anthology series of KC Concepcion. It premiered on March 29, 2008 to April 19, 2008 on ABS-CBN. In this show, KC showcases her different talents in acting.

Episodes

Bb. Palengke
Cast: KC Concepcion, Ai-Ai Delas Alas, and Jake Cuenca
Additionals cast: Rubi Rubi and Empoy Marquez and Vice Ganda
Directed by: Wenn Deramas

Yes, Sir!
Cast: KC Concepcion, Luis Manzano, and Albert Martinez
Additionals cast: Gina Pareño, Stella Cañete
Directed by: Andoy Ranay
Story: Kate is a workaholic who is bent on taking care of her ailing grandmother,  portrayed by veteran actress Gina Pareño. Expectedly, Kate's dedication to her job puts a strain on her relationship with Burdoy (Luis Manzano). Determined to put her career first and spend more time in the office, Kate ultimately develops a close friendship with her boss Ed (Albert Martinez). In a crucial business meeting, Kate saves the day by using her natural wit and charm. This makes  Ed grow fond of her. The boss-employee friendship will consequently open the doors for wonderful life lessons and the real meaning of happiness.

Time's Up!
Cast: KC Concepcion and Makisig Morales 
Additionals cast: Zanjoe Marudo, Jiro Manio, Joshua Cadelina, Matteo Guidicelli, Gardo Versoza
Special Participation: Allan Paule and Al Tantay
Directed by: Jerry Lopez Sineneng

Love 2 Dance
(Mega Manila rating: 20.8% vs Pinoy Idol: 20.0%)
Cast: KC Concepcion and Vhong Navarro
Additionals cast: G-force, Kitkat, Mico Palanca, John Arcilla
Special Participation: Victor Basa
Directed by: Johnny Manahan

See also
List of programs broadcast by ABS-CBN
List of shows previously aired by ABS-CBN

References

ABS-CBN drama series
2008 Philippine television series debuts
2008 Philippine television series endings
Philippine anthology television series
Filipino-language television shows